Louis Jacques Maurice de Bonald (30 October 1787 – 23 February 1870) was a French cardinal and Archbishop of Lyon.

Biography
Born at Millau, he was the son of the philosopher Louis Gabriel Ambroise de Bonald.

He was condemned by the council of state for a pastoral letter attacking Dupin the elder's Manuel de droit ecclsiastique. In 1848 he held a memorial service for those who fell gloriously in defence of civil and religious liberty. In 1851 he nevertheless advocated in the senate the maintenance of the temporal power of the Pope by force of arms.

See also
 Catholic Church in France
 Our Lady of La Salette

References

1787 births
1870 deaths
People from Millau
19th-century French cardinals
Cardinals created by Pope Gregory XVI
Bishops of Le Puy-en-Velay
Archbishops of Lyon
Bonald